This is a list of programs currently, formerly, and soon to be broadcast by the Arutz HaYeladim.

Productions
 Al Mali VeLama (על מלי ולמה)
 Alifim (אליפים)
 Deus (דאוס)
 Eilat (אילת)
 Elisha (אלישע)
 Etz HaPitpuzm (עץ הפיטפוזים)
 Galis (גאליס)
 Ginat Hahaftaot (גינת ההפתעות)
 HaBigbagim (הביגבגים)
 HaEe (האי)
 HaHolmim (החולמים)
 HaKita HaMeofefet (הכיתה המעופפת)
 HaMachsan Shel Keilu (המחסן של כאילו)
 HaMofa Shel Guru VeGogol (המופע של גורו וגוגול)
 Ha'Nephilim (הנפילים)
 HaPijamot (הפיג'מות)
 HaShminiya (השמיניה)
 Hugo (הוגו)
 Kadur Poreach (כדור פורח)
 Mario (מריו)
 Mishpacha Sholetet (משפחה שולטת)
 Nidhafim (נדחפים)
 Oboy (או-בוי)
 Proyect HaLehaka (פרוייקט הלהקה)
 Rosh Gadol (ראש גדול)
 Sipurey Uli VeYuli (סיפורי אולי ויולי)
 Shovrey Galim (שוברי גלים)
 Sofsheli (סופשלי)
 Teivat HaHaftaot (תיבת ההפתעות)
 ZoomZoom (זומזום)

Live-action

 24Seven
 The A-Team
 The Adventures of the Black Stallion
 A Different World 
 A gURLs wURLd 
 Ace Lightning
 The Adrenaline Project
 Adventures on Kythera
 The Adventures of Pete & Pete
 The Adventures of Mary-Kate & Ashley 
 ALF
 All in the Family 
 All Over the Workplace 
 Amazing Stories
 Amigos x siempre 
 Amy, la niña de la mochila azul 
 Animal Atlas 
 Animal Ark 
 Animorphs 
 Annedroids
 Are You Afraid of the Dark? 
 Art Ninja 
 Artzooka!
 Baby Einstein
 Baby Talk
 Backyard Science 
 Barney & Friends
 Batman
 Baxter 
 The Beachcombers
 Beakman's World 
 Bear in the Big Blue House
 Bernard's Watch
 Beverly Hills, 90210
 Big Bad Beetleborgs
 The Bionic Woman
 The Blobheads 
 Boohbah
 The Brady Bunch 
 Breaker High 
 The Bureau of Magical Things
 Cake 
 California Dreams 
 Casi Ángeles
 Cavegirl 
 Charles in Charge
 Cheers 
 Chicken Minute
 Children of the Dog Star
 Chiquititas
 City Guys
 Clarissa Explains It All
 Club 57 (TV series)
 Clueless
 Cockleshell Bay 
 Cómplices Al Rescate  
 Connor Undercover
 Crash Zone 
 Cybergirl
 Cybernet 
 The Cosby Show
 Dance Revolution 
 Dance Academy 
 Darcy's Wild Life
 Dark Oracle 
 Dead Gorgeous 
 Debra!
 Deepwater Black 
 Degrassi Junior High 
 Degrassi High 
 Degrassi: The Next Generation 
 Diff'rent Strokes
 Donkey Hodie 
 Drake and Josh
 Dwight in Shining Armor
 The Elephant Princess 
 The Elephant Show
 Emily of New Moon 
 The Enid Blyton Adventure Series
 The Enid Blyton Secret Series
 Enid Blyton's Enchanted Lands
 Extreme Babysitting
 Family Ties 
 Family Matters
 The Famous Five
 The Famous Jett Jackson 
 Finding Stuff Out 
 Flight 29 Down 
 Flipper 
 Fraggle Rock
 The Fresh Prince of Bel-Air
 Full House
 Grachi
 Goosebumps 
 Gortimer Gibbon's Life on Normal Street
 Groundling Marsh
 Growing Pains 
 Hallo Spencer
 Hangin' with Mr. Cooper 
 Hannah Montana
 Hard Time on Planet Earth
 Harry and the Hendersons
 Head of the Class 
 Helen and the Boys 
 The Henderson Kids
 Hi-5 (Australian series)
 Hi-5 (British series)
 Hillside 
 The Hogan Family 
 Home Improvement 
 How to Be Indie
 Hunter 
 iCarly
 Into the Labyrinth
 I Love Mummy 
 I Was a Sixth Grade Alien 
 In The Night Garden
 Instant Star 
 Iris, The Happy Professor
 Jim Henson's Animal Show
 Junior Vets 
 Just Add Magic
 Just for Laughs: Gags
 Just Kidding 
 Kally's Mashup 
 Kamen Rider: Dragon Knight
 Kenan & Kel 
 The Kicks
 Kirk
 Knight Rider 
 Kratts' Creatures
 The Latest Buzz
 LazyTown
 The Legend of the Hidden City
 Life with Derek
 Life with Boys 
 Little House on the Prairie
 Little Star 
 Lois & Clark: The New Adventures of Superman
 Los Luchadores
 MacGyver
 Madison
 Magic Mountain 
 Major Dad 
 Majority Rules! 
 Married... with Children
 Masked Rider
 Me and My Monsters 
 Meego
 Mentors 
 Microsoap
 Mighty Morphin Power Rangers
 Minor Adjustments 
 Mirror, Mirror (TV series) 
 Moesha
 Mowgli: The New Adventures of the Jungle Book 
 Mr. Young
 Mudpit
 The Muppet Show 
 MuppeTelevision
 Muppets Tonight
 My Brother and Me 
 My Perfect Landing
 My Secret Identity 
 My Two Dads
 The Mystery Files of Shelby Woo 
 Neighbours
 The New Adventures of Robin Hood 
 Nick Freno: Licensed Teacher 
 Nickelodeon Guts
 Night Man
 Ninja Turtles: The Next Mutation
 Ocean Girl
 The Odyssey 
 One of the Boys 
 Operation Ouch!
 Our Hero 
 Parker Lewis Can't Lose
 Party of Five
 Patito Feo
 Perfect Strangers
 Phenom 
 Phil of the Future
 Pirate Islands
 Princess Mirror-Belle
 Police Academy: The Series 
 Power Rangers Zeo
 Power Rangers Turbo
 Power Rangers in Space (repeats from Channel 2 and Fox Kids)
 Power Rangers Lost Galaxy
 Power Rangers Mystic Force
 Power Rangers Time Force
 Power Rangers Wild Force
 Power Rangers Samurai
 Power Rangers Megaforce
 Power Rangers Dino Charge (season 1 only) 
 Power Rangers Dino Fury
 Power Rangers Beast Morphers
 Power Rangers Ninja Steel
 Punky Brewster
 The Queen's Nose
 R. L. Stine's The Haunting Hour: The Series 
 Radio Free Roscoe
 Rebelde  (Brazilian version)
 Renford Rejects
 Rincón de Luz 
 Roger and the Rottentrolls
 Roseanne
 Round the Twist
 Ruby and the Well
 Sabrina the Teenage Witch 
 The Saddle Club 
 Saved by the Bell
 Saved by the Bell: The College Years 
 Saved by the Bell: The New Class 
 Second Noah 
 Secret Life of Toys 
 The Secret World of Alex Mack
 Shalom Sesame
 Sidekicks
 Sister, Sister
 Skippy the Bush Kangaroo
 Sliders
 Soy Luna
 Sooty & Co.
 Split
 Step by Step
 The Storyteller
 Student Bodies
 The Suite Life of Zack & Cody
 Sueña Conmigo
 Survive This 
 Super Gran
 Super Rupert 
 Sweet Valley High
 Taina 
 That's So Raven 
 Teletubbies
 Three's Company
 Twirlywoos
 Two of a Kind 
 VR Troopers
 The Wayne Manifesto 
 The Next Step
 Weird Science
 What I Like About You 
 Wishbone
 Who's the Boss? 
 Wicked Science 
 Wimzie's House
 Wingin' It 
 WMAC Masters
 The Wonder Years
 Woof!
 World Poker Tour
 The Worst Witch
 Xuxa
 The Yes-No Game Show
 Zoboomafoo
 Zoo Clues 
 Zoom

Animated series

 1001 Nights 
 101 Dalmatians: The Series
 2 Stupid Dogs
 64 Zoo Lane
 6teen
 A Pup Named Scooby-Doo
 A Thousand and One... Americas
 Aaahh!!! Real Monsters
 Ace Ventura: Pet Detective
 The Adventures of Blinky Bill
 The Adventures of Hijitus
 The Adventures of Paddington Bear
 The Adventures of Raggedy Ann and Andy
 The Adventures of Rocky and Bullwinkle
 The Adventures of Sam 
 The Adventures of Sam & Max: Freelance Police 
 Adventures of Sonic the Hedgehog
 The Adventures of T-Rex
 The Adventures of Teddy Ruxpin
 The Adventures of Tintin
 Albert Says... Nature Knows Best 
 ALF: The Animated Series
 Alias the Jester
 Alice in Wonderland 
 Alien Racers
 Almost Naked Animals
 Alvin and the Chipmunks
 Amazing Animals 
 The Amazing Spiez!
 Anatole
 Angel's Friends 
 Angry Birds Blues
 Angry Birds Stella
 Angry Birds Toons
 Animalia
 Animal Crackers
 Animal Stories 
 Animaniacs (1993)
 Anne of Green Gables 
 Anthony Ant 
 Archibald the Koala
 Archie's Weird Mysteries
 Around the World in 80 Days
 Around the World with Willy Fog
 Arthur
 Astro Farm 
 Atomic Betty
 Augie Doggie and Doggie Daddy
 Avenger Penguins
 B-Daman Crossfire 
 B-Daman Fireblast 
 Babar
 The Baby Huey Show
 Baby Looney Tunes
 Back to the Future: The Animated Series
 Bakugan Battle Brawlers 
 Bananaman
 Bandolero 
 Barbie Dreamtopia
 Barbie: Life in the Dreamhouse 
 The Baskervilles 
 Basket Fever 
 The Basketeers 
 Batman: The Animated Series
 Batman of the Future
 The Batman 
 Batman: The Brave and the Bold
 Beast Wars: Transformers 
 Ben 10
 Ben 10: Alien Force 
 Beetlejuice: The Animated Series
 Being Ian
 Benjamin the Elephant
 The Berenstain Bears 
 Beethoven 
 The Bellflower Bunnies
 Beverly Hills Teens
 Beyblade
 Beyblade Burst
 Beyblade: Metal Fusion
 BeyWheelz
 Bibi & Tina
 Big Guy and Rusty the Boy Robot
 Biker Mice from Mars
 The Big Knights 
 Bill & Ted's Excellent Adventures: The Series
 Billy the Cat
 Bionic Six
 Birdz
 Blaster's Universe 
 Bleach 
 The Bluffers
 Bob and Margaret
 Bob the Builder (Seasons 1-4)
 Bob in a Bottle
 Bobby's World
 Bobobobs
 Bozo: The World's Most Famous Clown
 The Boy
 Brambly Hedge 
 Bratz 
 Bratzillaz 
 Breezly and Sneezly
 Bright Sparks
 The Brothers Flub
 Bruno the Kid
 A Bunch of Munsch
 Bureau of Alien Detectors 
 The Busy World of Richard Scarry
 C Bear and Jamal
 Camp Candy
 Camp Lakebottom
 Captain N: The Game Master 
 Captain Zed and the Zee Zone 
 Cardcaptor Sakura
 The Care Bears (DiC & Nelvana episodes)
 Carl²
 Carmen Sandiego
 CatDog 
 Chaotic
 Casper's Scare School
 Cédric
 Célestin
 The Charlie Brown and Snoopy Show
 Chipie et Clyde
 Chucklewood Critters
 CJ the DJ
 Clang Invasion
 Clay Kids
 C.L.Y.D.E.
 The Cobi Troupe 
 Commander Clark
 Committed 
 COPS 
 Code Lyoko
 Code Lyoko: Evolution
 Codename: Kids Next Door
 The Comic Strip
 Contraptus 
 Corduroy 
 The Country Mouse and the City Mouse Adventures 
 Corneil & Bernie
 Courage the Cowardly Dog
 Cosmic Cowboys 
 Cow and Chicken
 Crafty Kids Club 
 The Cramp Twins
 Creepy Crawlers
 Creepy Crawlies
 Crayon Shin-chan 
 Crocadoo 
 Cubix
 Curious George
 Cyberchase
 The DaVincibles 
 The Daltons
 Dan Vs.
 Dastardly and Muttley in Their Flying Machines 
 Dennis the Menace
 Dennis the Menace and Gnasher
 Detective Bogey 
 Dexter's Laboratory
 Di-Gata Defenders
 Dig and Dug
 Dino-Riders
 Dinofroz
 Dinosaur King
 Dinosaucers 
 Dofus 
 Dogtanian and the Three Muskehounds
 Doug
 Downtown 
 Dr. Dimensionpants 
 Dr. Dog 
 Dragon Ball GT
 Dragon Ball Z
 Dragon Booster 
 Dragon Flyz
 Dragon Tales
 Dream Defenders 
 The Dreamstone
 Droopy, Master Detective
 Duel Masters 
 Dumb Bunnies 
 Dungeons & Dragons 
 Ed, Edd n Eddy
 Edgar & Ellen
 Eek! The Cat
 Eggzavier the Eggasaurus 
 Eliot Kid
 Elliot Moose 
 Extreme Ghostbusters
 The Fairly OddParents! (season 1–5)
 Fairy Tale Police Department 
 Famous 5: On the Case
 Fantaghirò
 The Fantastic Voyages of Sinbad the Sailor
 Fantômette
 Fat Dog Mendoza 
 Fievel's American Tails
 Felix the Cat
 Fighting Foodons
 Flight Squad 
 The Flintstones
 Fly Tales 
 Flying Rhino Junior High
 Foster's Home for Imaginary Friends
 Four Eyes!
 Fourways Farm 
 Foxbusters
 Franklin
 Freakazoid!
 Free Willy
 Fruits Basket
 Funky Cops
 F-Zero: GP Legend
 Garfield and Friends
 Gawayn
 George of the Jungle (2007)
 George Shrinks
 Geronimo Stilton 
 G.I. Joe: A Real American Hero
 G.I. Joe: Sigma 6
 Girlstuff/Boystuff
 Gloria's House
 Gormiti
 The Gravediggers Squad 
 The Greedysaurus Gang 
 The Green Squad
 Groove High 
 Growing Up Creepie
 Happy Ness: Secret of the Loch 
 Hareport
 Hatchimals
 Hattytown Tales
 He-Man and the Masters of the Universe
 He-Man and the Masters of the Universe (2002)
 Heathcliff 
 Heroes: Legend of the Battle Disks 
 Hi Hi Puffy AmiYumi
 The High Fructose Adventures of Annoying Orange 
 Hikaru no Go
 Histeria!
 Honeybee Hutch 
 Horrid Henry
 Horseland 
 Horrible Histories 
 The Houndcats
 Huntik: Secrets & Seekers 
 Hurricanes 
 I Am Weasel
 I.N.K. Invisible Network of Kids 
 Inami 
 Inazuma Eleven
 Inazuma Eleven GO
 The Incredible Hulk (1982) 
 The Incredible Hulk (1996)
 Inspector Gadget
 Inuyasha
 Iznogoud 
 Itsy Bitsy Spider
 Ivanhoe The King's Knight
 Jackie Chan Adventures
 Jacob Two-Two
 Jacques Cousteau's Ocean Tales 
 James Bond Jr.
 The Jetsons
 Jibber Jabber
 Jin Jin and the Panda Patrol 
 Johnny Bravo
 Journey to the Heart of the World 
 Journey to the West - Legends of the Monkey King 
 Juanito Jones
 The Jungle Book
 The Jungle Bunch 
 Jungle Tales 
 Juniper Jungle
 Jumanji
 Justice League
 Justice League Unlimited
 Kaboodle
 Kaleido Star 
 Kampung Boy
 The Karate Kid
 Kenny the Shark
 The Ketchup Vampires 
 Kid Paddle
 Kidd Video 
 A Kind of Magic
 Kipper 
 Kirby: Right Back at Ya!
 Larva
 Laurel and Hardy 
 Le Bonheur de la vie
 League of Super Evil
 The Legend of Calamity Jane
 Legend of the Dragon 
 The Legend of the North Wind
 The Legends of Treasure Island
 The Legend of White Fang
 Legion of Super Heroes
 Let's Go Luna!
 Lexie & Lottie: Trusty Twin Detectives
 The Life and Times of Juniper Lee
 Life with Louie
 Lilly the Witch 
 Lisa
 The Littl' Bits 
 Little Bear 
 The Little Flying Bears
 Little Hippo  
 The Little Lulu Show 
 Little Monsters 
 Little Nick 
 The Little Prince
 Little Rosey
 Little Spirou 
 The Littles
 Littlest Pet Shop 
 Lola & Virginia
 LoliRock 
 Looney Tunes
 Loopy De Loop
 The Lost World 
 Lou!
 Lucas the Spider
 Macron 1 
 Maggie and the Ferocious Beast
 Magi-Nation
 The Magic School Bus
 The Magician
 Maple Town
 Marco 
 Martha Speaks
 Martin Morning
 Martin Mystery
 Marvin the Tap-Dancing Horse
 Mary-Kate and Ashley in Action!
 The Mask: Animated Series 
 Matt's Monsters
 Max Adventures 
 Max Steel 
 Maxie's World
 Maya & Miguel
 Maya the Honey Bee
 Men in Black: The Series
 Mermaid Melody Pichi Pichi Pitch
 Merrie Melodies
 Mew Mew Power 
 Miffy 
 Mighty Max
 Mimiman
 The Minimighty Kids 
 Minuscule 
 Mix Master 
 Moby Dick and the Secret of Mu 
 Mona the Vampire
 Monster & Pirates
 Monster Allergy
 Monster by Mistake
 Monster High 
 Moville Mysteries
 The Mozart Band
 Mr. Bogus
 ¡Mucha Lucha!
 Mumble Bumble 
 The Mumbly Cartoon Show 
 Mummies Alive! 
 The Mummy: The Animated Series
 Musti
 My Dad the Rock Star 
 My Favorite Fairy Tales 
 My Friend Grompf 
 My Goldfish is Evil
 My Pet Monster
 The Mysteries of Alfred Hedgehog 
 Mythic Warriors 
 Naruto
 Ned's Newt
 Nellie the Elephant
 Nerds and Monsters
 The Neverending Story
 The New Adventures of Flash Gordon
 The New Adventures of Lassie 
 The New Adventures of Lucky Luke 
 The New Adventures of Nanoboy
 The New Adventures of Peter Pan
 The New Adventures of Speed Racer
 The New Adventures of Zorro
 The New Archies
 The New Batman Adventures
 Nils Holgersson 
 Nina Patalo 
 Noah's Island
 Noddy's Toyland Adventures 
 Noozles
 Nutri Ventures - The Quest for the 7 Kingdoms 
 Oakie Doke 
 Oddbods
 Oggy and the Cockroaches
 Magical DoReMi
 Old Bear Stories
 Om Nom Stories
 Once Upon a Time...
 One Piece (4Kids)
 Orson and Olivia
 Oscar and Friends 
 Ovide and the Gang
 The Owl
 The Owl & Co
 The Oz Kids
 Ozzy & Drix
 Pablo the Little Red Fox 
 Pac-Man and the Ghostly Adventures
 Pelswick
 Percy the Park Keeper 
 Pet Alien 
 Peter Pan & the Pirates 
 Piggsburg Pigs!
 Piggy Tales
 The Pink Panther Show
 Pink Panther and Sons 
 Pinky and the Brain
 Pinocchio: The Series
 Pippi Longstocking
Pipsqueak's Planet
 Pirate Family
 Pixie and Dixie and Mr. Jinks
 Pocahontas 
 Pocket Dragon Adventures
 Pok & Mok 
 Pokémon (Seasons 1–10, 17-present)
 Pokémon Chronicles
 Polly Pocket
 Police Academy
 The Pondles
 PopPixie 
 Postcards from Buster 
 Pound Puppies
 Power Stone 
 Powerbirds 
 The Powerpuff Girls
 Princess of the Nile 
 Princess Sissi
 Project G.e.e.K.e.R.
 ProStars
 The Raccoons 
 The Ranch 
 Ranma ½
 Ratz 
 Raymond
 The Real Ghostbusters
 The Real Story of Happy Birthday to You
 Really Wild Animals 
 ReBoot 
 Redwall 
 The Ren & Stimpy Show
 Rescue Heroes
 Ripley's Believe It or Not! 
 Road Rovers
 Robin Hood: Mischief in Sherwood
 Robinson Sucroe
 Robotboy
 Rocko's Modern Life
 Rod 'n' Emu
 Rolie Polie Olie
 RollBots
 Ruby Gloom
 Saban's Adventures of Oliver Twist 
 Sabrina: The Animated Series
 Sabrina's Secret Life
 Sailor Moon
 Sally Bollywood: Super Detective 
 Salty's Lighthouse 
 Samurai 7 
 Samurai Jack
 Samurai Pizza Cats
 Sandokan
 Sandra the Fairytale Detective 
 Scaredy Squirrel
 Scooby-Doo, Where Are You! 
 The Scooby-Doo Show 
 The Secret Show 
 Seven Little Monsters
 Sgt. Frog
 Shaman King
 Sharky & George 
 She-Ra: Princess of Power
 Sheeep 
 Sherlock Holmes in the 22nd Century
 SheZow
 Sid the Science Kid 
 Sidekick 
 SilverHawks 
 Simba, the King Lion 
 Simon in the Land of Chalk Drawings 
 The Simpsons (Seasons 1-5)
 Sitting Ducks 
 Skunk Fu!
 Sky Dancers
 Slugterra
 The Small Giant 
 The Smoggies
 The Smurfs (Seasons 1–4)
 Sonic Boom 
 Sooty's Amazing Adventures
 Soul Music
 Snorks
 Space Goofs
 Space Strikers 
 Spaced Out 
 Spider-Man and His Amazing Friends
 Spider-Man 5000
 Spider-Man (1994)
 Spider-Man: The New Animated Series 
 The Spectacular Spider-Man
 Spider-Woman 
 Spike and Suzy
 Spike Team 
 Stargate Infinity
 Star Street: The Adventures of the Star Kids 
 Static Shock
 Stickin' Around
 Street Football
 Stuart Little: The Animated Series
 Sugar Sugar Rune 
 Super 4
 Super Dave: Daredevil for Hire
 Super Duper Sumos
 The Super Globetrotters 
 Superman: The Animated Series
 Supernormal
 The Super Mario Bros. Super Show!
 Sweet Little Monsters 
 Sylvanian Families 
 Sylvester and Tweety Mysteries
 Tai Chi Chasers
 Tales of the Tooth Fairies 
 Taotao
 Tara Duncan: The Evil Empress 
 Taz-Mania
 Teen Titans
 Teenage Fairytale Dropouts
 Teenage Mutant Ninja Turtles (1987) 
 Teenage Mutant Ninja Turtles (2003) 
 Tenkai Knights 
 Theodore Tugboat 
 Thomas & Friends (seasons 22-24)
 Thomas & Friends: All Engines Go!
 The Three Bears
 The Three Friends and Jerry
 Three Little Ghosts
 Thundarr the Barbarian 
 Thunderbirds Are Go
 ThunderCats
 Timberwood Tales 
 Time Jam: Valerian & Laureline
 Time Warp Trio 
 Timothy Goes to School 
 Tiny Toon Adventures'''
 Titeuf Tom 
 Tom and Jerry Tom and Jerry Kids Tom and Jerry Tales Tommy e Oscar Toonsylvania Top Cat Total Drama Total DramaRama Toto Trouble Touni et Litelle Tracey McBean Transformers: Prime Transformers: Robots in Disguise (2015) 
 The Triplets 
 Trolls of Troy 
 Tsubasa: Reservoir Chronicle 
 Tupu 
 The Twins of Destiny The Twisted Tales of Felix the Cat 
 The Twisted Whiskers Show 
 The Ugly Duckling Ultimate Book of Spells Ultimate Muscle Vampires, Pirates & Aliens Visionaries: Knights of the Magical Light 
 Viva Piñata The Wacky World of Tex Avery The Wacky World of Tic and Tac 
 Wakfu 
 Wakkaville 
 Waldo's Way Wallace and Gromit Watership Down 
 The Way Things Work 
 Waynehead What-a-Mess What's New, Scooby-Doo? What's the Big Idea? Where on Earth Is Carmen Sandiego? Where's Wally 
 The Why Why Family 
 Wild Kratts 
 Wild West C.O.W.-Boys of Moo Mesa William's Wish Wellingtons 
 Winx Club Wisdom of the Gnomes 
 Wish Kid 
 Witch World 
 WordGirl 
 The World of David the Gnome 
 The World of Peter Rabbit and Friends 
 World of Quest 
 The WotWots 
 Wowser 
 Wunderkind Little Amadeus 
 Wyrd Sisters 
 X-DuckX 
 X-Men: Evolution Xiaolin Showdown Yakari 
 Yogi Bear Yo-Kai Watch Yolanda: Daughter of the Black Corsair 
 Yu Yu Hakusho 
 Yu-Gi-Oh! Yu-Gi-Oh! Arc-V Yu-Gi-Oh! 5D's Yu-Gi-Oh! GX Yu-Gi-Oh! Vrains Yu-Gi-Oh! Zexal Zazoo U The Zeta Project 
 Zig & Sharko Zixx Zoids: Chaotic Century 
 Zoids: New Century 
 Zoo Olympics Zoo Cup 

Cartoon Network
In July 2011, Arutz Hayeladim started to air a block of shows distributed by Cartoon Network and in June 2012, by Warner Bros. Animation, as well.
Both contracts expired in January 2019, then yes held broadcast rights for new and library programs between August 2019 and October 2021. Shows which aired on the block included:

2011
 Ben 10: Alien Force (season 3) 
 Bakugan: Gundalian Invaders Generator Rex 
 Puppy in My Pocket: Adventures in Pocketville 
 Adventure Time 
 Total Drama Island (reruns) 
 Total Drama Action (reruns) 
 Total Drama World Tour (reruns) 
 What's New, Scooby-Doo? (reruns)
 Legion of Super Heroes (reruns)

2012
 Ben 10: Ultimate Alien Hot Wheels Battle Force 5 Redakai: Conquer the Kairu The Amazing World of Gumball Bakugan: Mechtanium Surge 
 The Garfield Show 
 The Looney Tunes Show 
 Batman: The Brave and the Bold (reruns of season 1, and premieres of seasons 2–3)
 ThunderCats 
 Regular Show Baby Looney Tunes 
 Ben 10/Generator Rex: Heroes United (TV movie)
 Ben 10: Destroy All Aliens (TV movie)

2013
 Transformers: Prime Johnny Test (seasons 5–6) 
 Angelo Rules Pound Puppies Ben 10: Omniverse Scooby-Doo! Mystery Incorporated Young Justice DreamWorks Dragons (season 1–2)
 Gormiti Nature Unleashed Green Lantern: The Animated Series2014
 Mixels 
 The Tom and Jerry Show Steven Universe Lego Star Wars: The Yoda Chronicles (season 1)
 Uncle Grandpa 
 Transformers Prime Beast Hunters: Predacons Rising (TV movie)

2015
 Teen Titans Go! Transformers: Robots in Disguise (season 1)
 Inspector Gadget (2015) Lego Ninjago: Masters of Spinjitzu (season 4-5) 
 Clarence Mr. Bean: The Animated Series Lego DC Comics: Batman Be-Leaguered (TV movie)

2016
 Wabbit Be Cool, Scooby-Doo! DC Super Hero Girls DC Super Hero Girls: Super Hero High (TV movie)

2017
 Batman Unlimited 
 The Powerpuff Girls (2016) Oddbods We Bare Bears Supernoobs Bunnicula Ben 10 (2016) Justice League Action 
 My Knight and Me 
 Exchange Student Zero 
 The Garfield Show: Rodent Rebellion (TV movie)
 Over the Garden Wall (TV movie)

Dreamworks Animation
In 2016, Arutz Hayeladim started to air shows produced by DreamWorks Animation. Following NBCUniversal's acquisition of DreamWorks Animation in 2016, the partnership was expanded to include the output of NBCUniversal Global Distribution Kids & Family, including:

2015
 Turbo FAST2016
 All Hail King Julien The Adventures of Puss in Boots Dragons: Race to the Edge 
 Dinotrux The Mr. Peabody & Sherman Show Dawn of the Croods2017
 Voltron: Legendary Defender Home: Adventures with Tip & Oh Spirit Riding Free2018
 Trollhunters: Tales of Arcadia (following expiration of Netflix first-window)
 Trolls: The Beat Goes On!2019
 The Adventures of Rocky and Bullwinkle American Ninja Warrior Junior (seasons 1-2)

2020
 Kung Fu Panda: The Paws of Destiny Where's Waldo? 

2021
 The Boss Baby: Back in Business (season 1, following expiration of Netflix first-window)
 Harvey Girls Forever! (following expiration of Netflix first-window) 
 The Epic Tales of Captain Underpants (season 1, following expiration of Netflix first-window)
 3Below: Tales of Arcadia (following expiration of Netflix first-window)
 Madagascar: A Little Wild2022 
 Cleopatra in Space Powerbirds  
 The Mighty Ones2023 
 Abominable and the Invisible City''

Lists of television series by network
Israeli television-related lists